San Sebastián de La Gomera is the capital and a municipality of La Gomera in the Canary Islands, Spain. It also hosts the main harbour.

The port serves ferry routes to the islands of Tenerife, La Palma and El Hierro. Streets include Calle Real and F. Olsen. A bus station named Estación de Guaguas is used for bus lines throughout the island; it is located on Avenida Del Quinto Centenario.

History 
The area was inhabited by the Guanches before the arrival of the Spanish. Hernán Peraza arrived in 1440. Christopher Columbus stopped at the harbour on 6 September 1492 before heading to India but arrived in America instead. The building in which Columbus stayed whilst on the island is now a museum. The town is named after Saint Sebastián de Milán, an early Christian saint and martyr.

Historical population

Sites of interest in the town 
 Torre del Conde - a tower in the middle of the valley
 Casa del Colón, a museum dedicated to Christopher Columbus
 Museo Arqueológico de La Gomera - a museum dedicated to Guanche's social, political and religious structures
 Casa de los Peraza
 Pozo de La Aguada
 Iglesia de La Asunción and Ermita de San Sebastián Churches
 Ermita de la Virgen de Guadalupe
 Playa de San Sebastián
 Playa de la Cueva
 Mercado Municipal

Municipality 
Apart from the town of San Sebastián the municipality includes the settlements of 
 Benchijigua
 Jerdune
 La Laja
 Lomo Fragoso
 the eastern part of Playa Santiago

The municipality also includes these sites of interest:
 Barranco del Cabrito
 Los Roques rocks
 Punta Llana
 Majona Nature Park

Economy 
The economy of San Sebastián de La Gomera is centered on the functions of the capital and its port, as well as in the public sector, particularly in the transportation, trading, and tourism of Tenerife.

Tourism 
The port serves as a hub for tourists arriving on the 35-minute ferry ride from the nearby island of Tenerife, which is almost always visible from La Gomera. The main ferry companies are Fred. Olsen Express and Naviera Armas.

In Puntallana is the chapel of the Virgin of Guadalupe, the patron saint of the island of La Gomera.

List of Notable people 
 Ignacio Lorenzo de Armas (1706 - unknown), settler and mayor of San Antonio, Texas in 1738 and 1764.

Gallery

See also 

 List of municipalities in Santa Cruz de Tenerife

External links
 San Sebastian de La Gomera - Canary Islands Info

References 

Municipalities in La Gomera